The men's 100 metres event at the 2002 World Junior Championships in Athletics was held in Kingston, Jamaica, at National Stadium on 16 and 17 July.

Medalists

Results

Final
17 July
Wind: -0.6 m/s

Semifinals
17 July

Semifinal 1
Wind: +1.4 m/s

Semifinal 2
Wind: +1.9 m/s

Quarterfinals
16 July

Quarterfinal 1
Wind: +1.6 m/s

Quarterfinal 2
Wind: +3.9 m/s

Quarterfinal 3
Wind: +2.6 m/s

Quarterfinal 4
Wind: +1.4 m/s

Heats
16 July

Heat 1
Wind: +0.7 m/s

Heat 2
Wind: -1.2 m/s

Heat 3
Wind: +0.2 m/s

Heat 4
Wind: -0.3 m/s

Heat 5
Wind: -0.1 m/s

Heat 6
Wind: -1.3 m/s

Heat 7
Wind: 0.0 m/s

Heat 8
Wind: +1.5 m/s

Heat 9
Wind: +1.7 m/s

Participation
According to an unofficial count, 69 athletes from 53 countries participated in the event.

References

100 metres
100 metres at the World Athletics U20 Championships